During the 2004–05 English football season, West Ham United competed in the Football League Championship, having lost the previous season's play-off final 0–1 to Crystal Palace at the Millennium Stadium.

Season summary
Following the previous season's First Division play-off final loss to Crystal Palace, Rob Lee, Brian Deane, Wayne Quinn and Shaun Byrne were all released from West Ham on free transfers. They were closely followed by Kevin Horlock, who signed for Ipswich Town, and David Connolly, who left for Leicester City in a £500,000 deal. Sébastien Carole also returned to Monaco after his loan spell, while Richard Garcia and Elliott Ward signed new contracts.

The first signing Alan Pardew made following the end of the previous season was goalkeeper James Walker, signed on a free transfer from Walsall, where he had been a folk hero. He was brought in as cover for Stephen Bywater. The following month former England international Teddy Sheringham and Serhii Rebrov both signed on free transfers, from Portsmouth and Tottenham respectively. Their arrivals were closely followed by those of AFC Bournemouth captain Carl Fletcher for £275,000 and winger Luke Chadwick from Manchester United on a free transfer. In September, Malky Mackay signed for £300,000 from Norwich City.

West Ham's biggest defeat of the season was away to Cardiff City on 2 November 2004 when they lost 4–1. The Welsh team featured former Hammer Jobi McAnuff, who created the first two goals and scored the fourth. West Ham's biggest win of the season came in their home game against Plymouth Argyle on 19 February 2005 when they won 5–0.

West Ham only lost one of their last ten matches, which helped moved them from seventh to sixth, guaranteeing a play-off spot. The club returned to the FA Premier League at the second time of asking, defeating Preston North End in the 2005 Football League Championship play-off Final with a single goal from Bobby Zamora.

Final league table

First-team squad
Squad at end of season

Left club during season

Summer Transfers

In

Out

Winter Transfers

In

Out

Results

Championship

Championship play-offs

League Cup

FA Cup

Statistics

Overview

Goalscorers

Appearances and goals

|-
! colspan=14 style=background:#dcdcdc; text-align:center| Goalkeepers

|-
! colspan=14 style=background:#dcdcdc; text-align:center| Defenders

|-
! colspan=14 style=background:#dcdcdc; text-align:center| Midfielders

|-
! colspan=14 style=background:#dcdcdc; text-align:center| Forwards

|}

References

2004-05
2004–05 Football League Championship by team
2004 sports events in London
2005 sports events in London